Karagouana Mallé is a rural commune and village in the Cercle of Koutiala in the Sikasso Region of southern Mali. The commune covers an area of 182 square kilometers and includes 5 villages. In the 2009 census it had a population of 7,520. The village of Karagouana Mallé, the administrative centre (chef-lieu) of the commune, is 38 km northwest of Koutiala.

References

External links
.

Communes of Sikasso Region